Fazilatunesa Bappy (31 December 1970 – 2 January 2020) was a Bangladeshi lawyer and a politician representing the Bangladesh Awami League party. She was a member of the Jatiya Sangsad.

Biography
Bappy was born on 31 December 1970 in Narail in the then East Pakistan. She served as a prosecutor of the International Crime Tribunal and a deputy attorney general.

Bappy was involved with the politics of Bangladesh Awami League during her student life. She was elected as a member of the Jatiya Sangsad in 2011 and again in 2014.

Death 
Bappy died on 2 January 2020 in Bangabandhu Sheikh Mujib Medical University Hospital, Dhaka at the age of 49, suffering from pneumonia.

References

1970 births
2020 deaths
People from Narail District
20th-century Bangladeshi lawyers
9th Jatiya Sangsad members
10th Jatiya Sangsad members
Awami League politicians
Women members of the Jatiya Sangsad
21st-century Bangladeshi women politicians
21st-century Bangladeshi lawyers
Bangladeshi women lawyers